Martin Henry FitzPatrick Morris, 2nd Baron Killanin, PC(Ire) (22 July 1867 – 11 August 1927) was an Irish Unionist (Conservative) Member of Parliament (MP).

Background and education
Morris was the eldest son of Michael Morris, 1st Baron Killanin, Lord Chief Justice of Ireland, and was educated at Trinity College, Dublin, where he was secretary of the University Philosophical Society. He later became a barrister.

Political career

Morris was appointed High Sheriff of County Galway for 1897.

He was elected to the House of Commons for Galway Borough in 1900, a seat he held until the following year when he succeeded his father as second Baron Killanin and entered the House of Lords.

Lord Killanin was also a member of the Senate of the Royal University of Ireland from 1904 to 1909, Governor of University College, Galway from 1909 to 1922, and served as Lord Lieutenant of County Galway between 1918 and 1922. He was appointed to the Privy Council of Ireland in the 1920 New Year Honours following his chairmanship of the Committee on Irish Primary Education. He was awarded the Knight of Grace of Order of St. John of Jerusalem in England

Personal life
Lord Killanin died in July 1927, aged 59. He never married and was succeeded by his nephew Michael Morris, 3rd Baron Killanin.

Arms

See also
List of United Kingdom MPs with the shortest service

Footnotes

References 
 Obituary, The Times, 12 August 1927

External links 

 

1867 births
1927 deaths
Barons in the Peerage of the United Kingdom
High Sheriffs of County Galway
Morris, Martin
UK MPs who inherited peerages
Morris, Martin
Morris, 2nd Baron Killanin, Martin
Alumni of Trinity College Dublin
Irish barristers
Lord-Lieutenants of Galway
Members of the Privy Council of Ireland
Morris, Martin
Sons of life peers